Paul Brown (born 1952, New York, NY) is an American journalist and musician. He began his radio and journalism career at commercial radio station WPAQ in Mount Airy, NC. He began work in public radio in 1987, at NPR member station WFDD in Winston-Salem, NC. From 1999 to late 2013, he worked at NPR's Washington, DC headquarters as a news executive, editor, producer, reporter and world newscaster.  He is a traditional musician who acquired his first repertoire from his Virginia-born mother.  He is best known in music circles as a banjo player, fiddler and singer. He has documented musicians and music traditions, primarily in the southeastern US, and produced numerous recordings.

Recordings

 Robert Sykes & The Surry County Boys (Heritage Records) (1987)
 Way Down In North Carolina with Mike Seeger (Rounder Records) (1996)
 Benton Flippen: Old Time, New Times(Rounder Records) (1996)
 Blue Ridge Mountain Holiday: The Breaking Up Christmas Story (County Records) (1998)
Paul Brown: Red Clay Country (5-String Productions) (2006)
Benton Flippen & The Smokey Valley Boys: An Evening at WPAQ, 1984 (5-String Productions) (2008)
 The Mostly Mountain Boys (L-Century) (2013)
 Paul Brown: Red Dog (Ryland Records) (2018)
 Bryant and Brown (Tike Parlour Recordings) (2018)
 Paul Brown (Tiki Parlour Recordings) (2018)

References

External links
  Official website

1952 births
Living people
American country banjoists
American male journalists
American country fiddlers
American country singers